Gospeed is the second studio album by Swedish singer Vincent Pontare also known as Vincent. It was released on Little Stereo Recordings label in 2011 and distributed by Warner Music Sweden AB, as a follow-up to his debut album Lucky Thirteen. It contains 9 tracks with a 1960s and 1970s feel. It is mostly co-written by Vincent and John Engelbert of the band Johnossi.

Track list

References

2011 albums
Vincent Pontare albums